This is a list of the mammal species recorded in Grenada. Of the mammal species in Grenada, one is vulnerable and one is considered extinct.

The following tags are used to highlight each species' conservation status as assessed by the International Union for Conservation of Nature:

Some species were assessed using an earlier set of criteria. Species assessed using this system have the following instead of near threatened and least concern categories:

Subclass: Theria

Infraclass: Metatheria

Order: Didelphimorphia (common opossums)

Didelphimorphia is the order of common opossums of the Western Hemisphere. Opossums probably diverged from the basic South American marsupials in the late Cretaceous or early Paleocene. They are small to medium-sized marsupials, about the size of a large house cat, with a long snout and prehensile tail.

Family: Didelphidae (American opossums)
Subfamily: Didelphinae
Genus: Marmosa
 Robinson's mouse opossum, M. robinsoni

Infraclass: Eutheria

Order: Sirenia (manatees and dugongs)

Sirenia is an order of fully aquatic, herbivorous mammals that inhabit rivers, estuaries, coastal marine waters, swamps, and marine wetlands. All four species are endangered.

Family: Trichechidae
Genus: Trichechus
 West Indian manatee, T. manatus  extirpated

Order: Rodentia (Rodents)

Rodentia is an order of mammals characterised by two continuously growing incisors in the upper and lower jaws which must be kept short by gnawing.

Family: Dasyproctidae
Genus: Dasyprocta
 Red-rumped agouti, D. leporina  introduced

Order: Primates

The order Primates includes the lemurs, monkeys, and apes, with the latter category including humans.

Family: Cercopithecidae
Genus: Cercopithecus
 Mona monkey, C. mona  introduced

Order: Cingulata (armadillos)

The armadillos are small mammals with a bony armored shell. There are around 20 extant species. They are native to the Americas.

Family: Dasypodidae (armadillos)
Subfamily: Dasypodinae
Genus: Dasypus
 Nine-banded armadillo, D. novemcinctus

Order: Lagomorpha (rabbits and hares)

The lagomorphs comprise two families, Leporidae (hares and rabbits), and Ochotonidae (pikas). Though they can resemble rodents, and were classified as a superfamily in that order until the early 20th century, they have since been considered a separate order. They differ from rodents in a number of physical characteristics, such as having four incisors in the upper jaw rather than two.

Family: Leporidae
Genus: Lepus
European hare, L. europaeus  introduced

Order: Chiroptera (bats)

The bats' most distinguishing feature is that their forelimbs are developed as wings, making them the only mammals capable of flight. Bat species account for about 20% of all mammals.

Family: Noctilionidae
Genus: Noctilio
 Greater bulldog bat, N. leporinus 
Family: Vespertilionidae
Subfamily: Myotinae
Genus: Myotis
 Black myotis, M. nigricans 
 Myotis nyctor 
Family: Emballonuridae
Genus: Peropteryx
 Lesser doglike bat, P. macrotis 
 Trinidad dog-like bat, P. trinitatis 
Family: Mormoopidae
Genus: Pteronotus
 Naked-backed bat, P. davyi 
Family: Phyllostomidae
Subfamily: Phyllostominae
Genus: Dermanura
 Silver fruit-eating bat, D. glauca 
Genus: Micronycteris
 Little big-eared bat, M. megalotis 
Subfamily: Glossophaginae
Genus: Anoura
 Geoffroy's tailless bat, A. geoffroyi 
Genus: Glossophaga
 Miller's long-tongued bat, G. longirostris 
Subfamily: Carolliinae
Genus: Carollia
 Seba's short-tailed bat, C. perspicillata 
Subfamily: Stenodermatinae
Genus: Artibeus
 Jamaican fruit bat, A. jamaicensis 
 Great fruit-eating bat, A. lituratus 
 A. schwartzi

Order: Cetacea (whales)

The order Cetacea includes whales, dolphins and porpoises. They are the mammals most fully adapted to aquatic life with a spindle-shaped nearly hairless body, protected by a thick layer of blubber, and forelimbs and tail modified to provide propulsion underwater.

Suborder: Mysticeti
Family: Balaenopteridae (baleen whales)
Genus: Balaenoptera 
 Common minke whale, Balaenoptera acutorostrata
 Sei whale, Balaenoptera borealis
 Bryde's whale, Balaenoptera brydei
 Blue whale, Balaenoptera musculus
Genus: Megaptera
 Humpback whale, Megaptera novaeangliae
Suborder: Odontoceti
Superfamily: Platanistoidea
Family: Delphinidae (marine dolphins)
Genus: Delphinus
 Short-beaked common dolphin, Delphinus delphis DD
Genus: Feresa
 Pygmy killer whale, Feresa attenuata DD
Genus: Globicephala
 Short-finned pilot whale, Globicephala macrorhyncus DD
Genus: Lagenodelphis
 Fraser's dolphin, Lagenodelphis hosei DD
Genus: Grampus
 Risso's dolphin, Grampus griseus DD
Genus: Orcinus
 Killer whale, Orcinus orca DD
Genus: Peponocephala
 Melon-headed whale, Peponocephala electra DD
Genus: Pseudorca
 False killer whale, Pseudorca crassidens DD
Genus: Sotalia
 Guiana dolphin, Sotalia guianensis DD
Genus: Stenella
 Pantropical spotted dolphin, Stenella attenuata DD
 Clymene dolphin, Stenella clymene DD
 Striped dolphin, Stenella coeruleoalba DD
 Atlantic spotted dolphin, Stenella frontalis DD
 Spinner dolphin, Stenella longirostris DD
Genus: Steno
 Rough-toothed dolphin, Steno bredanensis DD
Genus: Tursiops
 Common bottlenose dolphin, Tursiops truncatus
Family: Physeteridae (sperm whales)
Genus: Physeter
 Sperm whale, Physeter catodon DD
Family: Kogiidae (dwarf sperm whales)
Genus: Kogia
 Pygmy sperm whale, Kogia breviceps DD
 Dwarf sperm whale, Kogia sima DD
Superfamily Ziphioidea
Family: Ziphidae (beaked whales)
Genus: Mesoplodon
 Gervais' beaked whale, Mesoplodon europaeus DD
Genus: Ziphius
 Cuvier's beaked whale, Ziphius cavirostris DD

Order: Carnivora (carnivorans)

There are over 260 species of carnivorans, the majority of which feed primarily on meat. They have a characteristic skull shape and dentition.
Suborder: Pinnipedia 
Family: Phocidae (earless seals)
Genus: Neomonachus
 Caribbean monk seal, N. tropicalis

Notes

References

See also
List of chordate orders
Lists of mammals by region
List of prehistoric mammals
Mammal classification
List of mammals described in the 2000s

Grenada
Mammals

Grenada